Arctostaphylos montereyensis is a species of manzanita known by the common names Monterey manzanita and Toro manzanita. It is endemic to Monterey County, California, where it is known from only a few occurrences around Fort Ord and Toro County Park near Salinas. It is a plant of maritime chaparral on sandy soils.

Description
This is a shrub reaching a maximum height between one and two meters, with bristly, glandular twigs. The dark green leaves are rough, bristly, and smooth-edged, sometimes with a waxy texture. They are 2 to 3 centimeters long and round to oval in shape. The inflorescence is a dense cluster of urn-shaped flowers, and the fruit is a bristly, glandular drupe about a centimeter wide.

References

External links
Jepson Manual Treatment
USDA Plants Profile
Photo gallery

montereyensis
Endemic flora of California
Natural history of the California chaparral and woodlands
Natural history of Monterey County, California
Plants described in 1964